Rubén Hernández Sánchez (born 10 July 1968) is a Mexican football manager and former player.

References

External links

Living people
1968 births
Mexican footballers
Association football forwards
C.D. Guadalajara footballers
Footballers from Guadalajara, Jalisco